Actifio was a privately held information technology firm headquartered in Waltham, Massachusetts. The company specialised in copy data virtualization for making information technology infrastructure more efficient by reducing unnecessary duplication of data.   On December 3, 2020, Google announced it intended to acquire Actifio for an undisclosed sum.  The acquisition closed on Monday Dec 14, 2020.

Products
Purportedly, Actifio's products are able to reduce unnecessary duplication of application data and software requirements for its users. The technology is designed to maintain data integrity while ensuring rapid access to that data throughout its entire life cycle. The system virtualizes data management and storage to replace siloed data protection and availability applications with a single purpose-built system. The process involves creating a "golden master" of production data that allows for a rapid manipulation and recovery of data if needed. This storage system is said to reduce data storage costs and improve efficiency over other data management applications.

History
In July 2009, Ash Ashutosh founded Actifio in Waltham, Massachusetts. The company started with four employees. It launched its first product in the fall of 2011.

In 2012 Gartner recommended Actifio in their Cool Vendor report and said its products facilitated cloud-based and offsite start and computing without the need to build secondary data centers. That year sales increased about 700 percent over 2011. By the end of 2012, Actifio had achieved five consecutive quarters of 500% year-on-year growth. In the fourth quarter of 2012 alone, Actifio did 62 deals with new clients with an average value of $210,000. In 2012, it was described as the fastest growing storage startup.

Staffing increased from 50 in December 2011 to 120 in May 2012. As of May 2012, about a fourth of the company's revenue came from Europe.

Funding
On July 21, 2010, Actifio announced that it had secured $8 million in series A funding. This round was led by North Bridge Venture Partners and Greylock Partners. Jamie Goldstein, general partner at North Bridge said, “Actifio has all the ingredients for success including a hot market opportunity, technological superiority, and a stellar executive team that will allow Actifio to deliver on the promise of Data Management Virtualization.” 

On September 30, 2010, Actifio announced that it had closed on $16 million in series B funding. This round of funding was led by Advanced Technology Ventures (ATV) with participation by North Bridge Venture Partners and Greylock Partners. It brought Actifio's total venture capital funding to $24 million.

In 2011, Actifio received $33 million in Series C funding led by Andreessen Horowitz. This firm, headed by Marc Andreessen and Ben Horowitz, has also funded Facebook, Zynga, and Twitter. Actifio had just started looking for its next round of funding when Peter Levine, a partner at Andreesen Horowitz, called to merely ask about Actifio's location. Actifio closed on funding nine days later. Levine said he did the deal because he believes Actifio will “dominate a large segment of the backup and storage space.” North Bridge Venture Partners, Greylock Partners, and Advanced Technology Ventures also invested in this round of funding. After completing its Series C funding, Actifio had received a total of $57 million in venture capital.

During Actifio's $50 million Series D round, media reported that investors valued the company at $500 million. After completing its Series D funding the firm had received $108 million in venture capital.

On 23 March 2014, Actifio announced that it had raised another $100 million in series E funding from Tiger Global Management, Andreessen Horowitz, Greylock Partners, North Bridge Venture Partners, Advanced Technology Ventures, and Technology Crossover Ventures that increased its implied valuation to $1.1 billion. This money came in the form of primary funding with no secondary liquidity for employees or earlier shareholders. Ashutosh said that $125 million could have been raised but that some money had been turned away. $75 million closed on 14 March and the rest on 7 April. After this round of funding, Actifio had raised $207.5 million in capital. In August 2018, Actifio took in $100 million.

Clients
Actifio clients included Time Warner Cable, Boston University Medical Campus, Navisite, the City of South Portland, Unilever, IBM, Netflix, and many other organizations As of October 2012, Actifio had about 180 clients and its deals averaged a value of about $250,000. By March 2013, Actifio had over 300 clients in 31 countries paying an average of $349,000 per three-year contract. The data under Actifio management at this time was over 1 exabyte, with 14 petabytes of active application data, and 55 petabytes of physical storage capacity. As of July 2014, there were about 400 Actifio clients worldwide, including both large multinationals and cloud service providers.

IBM OEM 
Actifio and IBM announced an OEM agreement on Feb 5, 2019.   This allowed IBM to sell an IBM Branded version of Actifio software as IBM InfoSphere Virtual Data Pipeline (VDP).

Acquisition 
On December 3, 2020, Google announced it intended to acquire Actifio for an undisclosed sum.  The acquisition closed on Monday Dec 14, 2020.   At that time Actifio informed State Authorities in Massachusetts that it was laying off 54 workers in that state.   It is unclear how many were laid off in other regions where Actifio had employees.

Copy data
Copy data consists of multiple copies of the same file. This data could come in the form of multiple copies of volumes, backups, test/dev, online copies for disaster recover, etc. In a study IDC found that about 75% of storage is consumed by copy data. Actifio conducts joint research with IDC to understand the copy data problem in depth. IDC estimated that businesses would spend roughly $44 billion on coping with copy data in 2013.

Actifio was one of the first firms to enter the copy data management (CDM) market.

In July 2014, Actifio introduced Resiliency Director, an automated disaster recovery tool. Sungard Availability Services, a disaster recovery firm, was able to recover hundreds of virtual machines in less than 20 minutes during a test of Resiliency Director.

Ash Ashutosh
Actifio was founded by Ash Ashutosh, who had previously served as chief technologist at HP's StorageWorks division, a position he took after HP acquired another Ashutosh startup, AppIQ in 2005.

Ashutosh holds an undergraduate degree in electrical engineering and a master's degree in computer science from Penn State University. After working for LSI and Intergraph, he joined StorageNetworks. Later he founded Serano Systems, a fiber channel controller manufacturer that he sold to Vitesse Semiconductor. His next venture was AppIQ, which was acquired by HP in 2005. After leaving HP in 2008, Ashutosh became a venture capitalist at Greylock Partners, where he was an investor in information technology companies, and ultimately founded Actifio. He left Greylock in 2009 to focus full-time on Actifio, serving as its president and CEO.

As of 2013, Ashutosh was an entrepreneur-in-residence at Harvard Business School. He also lectures at the Massachusetts Institute of Technology.

In 2013, Ashutosh was named "EY Entrepreneur of the Year" for New England by Ernst & Young.

Ashutosh is originally from India.

References

External links
 

Defunct technology companies of the United States
Technology companies established in 2009
Companies based in Massachusetts
2009 establishments in Massachusetts
2020 mergers and acquisitions
Technology companies disestablished in 2020
2020 disestablishments in Massachusetts